23:59: The Haunting Hour,  is a 2018 Singaporean horror comedy anthology film directed by Gilbert Chan. The film is a sequel to the film 23:59.

Plot
Tommy, who is serving national service, maintains a blog, where he posts about horror stories.

Cast
 Fabian Loo as Tommy
 Eric Lee
 Mark Lee
 Noah Yap
 Natalia Ng as Snake Woman 
 Richie Koh

Release
The film was released in theatres on 9 August 2018, National day. The film was a box office hit.

Reception
Liu Yongjian of Lianhe Zaobao gave the film 2 and a half stars out of five for entertainment and one star out of five for art. John Lui of The Straits Times gave the film 2.5 stars out of 5 in his review of the film, stating, "While somewhat redeemed by its last story, which warns us that often, the stranger you are sexting with might want something more than a steamy chat, the most frightening thing about this horror movie is the wasted potential." Douglas Tseng of 8 DAYS also gave the film 1.5 star out of 5 in his review of the film, stating, "Lame and lackluster, The Haunting Hour is more like Amateur Hour. Whatever potential Chan showed in the first movie isn’t here; he really dropped the ball on this one, and it fell through the floor and straight into the pits of Hell. What’s truly frightening is that this movie actually got made." He included the movie on his list of the worst movies of 2018.

References

External links
 

2018 films
2018 comedy horror films
Singaporean comedy horror films
English-language Singaporean films